Alexander Frear (1820 – May 22, 1882) was an American politician. He served as a councilman in New York City, and later an Alderman. He was elected to the New York State Assembly, and later in his life became the Commissioner of Emigration and Commissioner of Public Charities for New York City.

A Huguenot whose family immigrated from France, Frear was born on August 18, 1820; in Poughkeepsie, New York, where he received his schooling. In 1848, he founded an importing house 'Alexander Frear & Company'. The business was relatively successful until it went bankrupt in 1857. After the bankruptcy, Frear became involved in politics, getting elected to the New York City Council. In 1860, he was elected an alderman of New York. In 1865, and later 1866, he was elected to the New York State Assembly, where he served as William M. Tweed's spokesperson.

References 

1820 births
1882 deaths
Members of the New York State Assembly
New York City Council members
19th-century American politicians